U.S. Route 90 (US 90) is a major east-west highway in the U.S. state of Texas with large portions of it running concurrently with I-10. US 90 begins at Bus. I-10 in Van Horn, travels through San Antonio and Houston, and continues on into the state of Louisiana.

Route description

Van Horn to San Antonio
US 90 begins in Van Horn at an intersection with Bus. I-10 and SH 54. US 90 travels in a southeastern direction towards Marfa where it starts an overlap with US 67. US 90 travels south and runs parallel to the US-Mexico Border near the Rio Grande. US 90 crosses the Amistad Reservoir then runs through Del Rio. US 90 turns right and runs east towards Brackettville. US 90 runs through Uvalde and Medina counties. US 90 then arrives in San Antonio where it serves as a major freeway. Multiple stack interchanges are under construction to gain access in and out of the freeway along the intersections at Loop 1604 and I-410. Further, the highway has a major junction with TX-151 as it continues eastward towards the city's inner Westside until its interchange with I-10 and I-35 at the southwest corner of Downtown.

San Antonio to Houston
East of Downtown San Antonio, US 90 multiplexes with I-10. This overlap ends in Seguin, and continues where the two highways continually cross each other en route to Houston. US 90 once again duplexes with I-10 east of Columbus briefly separating near Brookshire and continue overlapping from Katy all the way to Houston. At I-610 east of Houston, US 90 becomes independently known as the Crosby Freeway.

The Crosby Freeway from east of Beltway 8 to east of Runneburg Road in Crosby, was constructed in the early 1990s and opened to traffic in 1992. After several delays, construction work on the inner section of the freeway began in 2006 and was opened to traffic in January 2011.
The western terminus of the Crosby Freeway connects to the I-610 and I-10 interchange via two freeway ramps:
a ramp from westbound Crosby Freeway, joining an exit ramp from westbound I-10 to enter southbound I-610
a newly constructed two-lane exit ramp from eastbound I-10 connecting to eastbound Crosby Freeway.
The previous interchange was a four-level stack interchange though the new interchange is not a full five-level stack.

Because of funding constraints, two sections of the freeway inside Beltway 8 were not built to full freeway standards: a half-mile section over Greens Bayou and an approximately mile-long section east of Normandy Street. As of December 2012, only the feeder roads have been constructed, with space reserved in the median for future freeway mainlanes. Unlike most new freeway extensions in the Houston area built in recent decades, the Crosby Freeway is not tolled. Also unlike most of Houston's existing freeways and tollways, the Crosby Freeway does not have continuous feeder roads.

The Crosby Freeway has four to six mainlanes for its entire length.

Houston to Louisiana
The US 90 (Beaumont Highway when inside of Beltway 8 or Crosby Freeway when outside of Beltway 8) heads northeast leaving Houston and ends its freeway status in Crosby. US 90 then continues traveling east through Beaumont and is locally known as College Street, passes by Baptist Hospital Beaumont and meets I-10 at a T-interchange. It then passes through Orange and has a business route (Business US 90-Y). It then crosses the Sabine River into Louisiana towards Lake Charles. With the exception of an  section with only two (briefly three) lanes between Liberty and Devers, US 90 has at least four lanes between Crosby and the Louisiana state line.

Major intersections

See also

Interstate 10 in Texas
U.S. Route 90 Alternate (Texas)

References

External links

90
 Texas
Transportation in Culberson County, Texas
Transportation in Jeff Davis County, Texas
Transportation in Presidio County, Texas
Transportation in Brewster County, Texas
Transportation in Pecos County, Texas
Transportation in Terrell County, Texas
Transportation in Val Verde County, Texas
Transportation in Kinney County, Texas
Transportation in Uvalde County, Texas
Transportation in Medina County, Texas
Transportation in Bexar County, Texas
Transportation in San Antonio
Transportation in Guadalupe County, Texas
Transportation in Caldwell County, Texas
Transportation in Gonzales County, Texas
Transportation in Fayette County, Texas
Transportation in Colorado County, Texas
Transportation in Austin County, Texas
Transportation in Waller County, Texas
Transportation in Fort Bend County, Texas
Transportation in Harris County, Texas
Roads in Houston
Transportation in Liberty County, Texas
Transportation in Jefferson County, Texas
Transportation in Orange County, Texas